Supreme Soviet elections were held in the Azeri SSR on 30 September and 14 October 1990. They were the first multi-party elections in the country.

Results

References
CIA World Factbook (1995)

Parliamentary elections in Azerbaijan
Supreme
Azerbaijan
Election and referendum articles with incomplete results